Dezerea Bryant (born April 27, 1993) is an American sprinter competing in the 100 metres and 200 m. She was the 200 m national champion in 2019. At the 2019 World Athletics Championships in Doha, she placed 5th in the 200 m and earned a bronze medal in the Women's 4x100m Relay. She has earned 17 NCAA Division 1 All-American honors and won the NCAA 200m championship in 2015 over The Bowerman Award Winner, Jenna Prandini. Bryant set a low-altitude collegiate record in 200 metres with 22.18.

NCAA
Bryant was an 17-time NCAA Division 1 All-American (recognized by U.S. Track & Field and Cross Country Coaches Association) and 22-time all-conference sprinter.

Clemson
Bryant is a nine-time All-American and nine-time All-Atlantic Coast Conference in her first two collegiate seasons.

Kentucky
Bryant is a nine-time All-American at Kentucky and 13-time All-South eastern conference. Watch Dezerea Bryant win 2015 NCAA Outdoor Track and Field Championships – Women's 200m

Professional
Dezerea Bryant worked two seasons as a Volunteer Assistant Coach with Tennessee's track and field team in 2015–2017. After a stellar collegiate sprinting career, Bryant worked with the Tennessee sprints and relays. In Fall 2017, Bryant moved to the training group in Florida.

Statistics
Information from IAAF profile or Track & Field Results Reporting System unless otherwise noted.

Personal bests
 = wind-assisted (over +2.0 m/s)

Seasonal bests
 = wind-assisted (over +2.0 m/s)

100 m

200 m

International championship results
 = personal best

National championship results
 = personal best
 = wind-assisted (over +2.0 m/s)
 = qualified for the next round

Diamond League

World ranking
Dezerea Bryant was ranked tenth in 200 metres in 2015. Bryant was ranked 13th in 200 metres in 2021.

Notes

References

External links
 
 
 Dezerea Bryant Position: Volunteer Assistant – Sprints University of Tennessee Volunteers.
 2016 film on "My Journey Dezerea Bryant"
 Wisconsin Track And Field Honor Roll Hall of Fame Inductee c/o 2017

1993 births
Living people
American female sprinters
Kentucky Wildcats women's track and field athletes
World Athletics Championships athletes for the United States
World Athletics Championships medalists
Kentucky women track and field athletes
Sportswomen from Kentucky
Track and field athletes from Milwaukee
USA Outdoor Track and Field Championships winners